Harmankaya can refer to:

 Harmankaya Canyon Nature Park
 Harmankaya, Cumayeri
 Harmankaya, Kemaliye
 Harmankaya Nature Park